Attack on Memory is the second studio album and third LP overall by Cloud Nothings. It was released on January 24, 2012, by Carpark Records and was engineered by Steve Albini at his Electrical Audio studio in Chicago.  The album is the first to include frontman Dylan Baldi's live band as full-time members and co-writers, and has been noted for its heavier sound and darker songs, a sharp turn from the power pop of previous releases.

Recording

Production
Attack on Memory was engineered by Steve Albini at his Electrical Audio studio in Chicago. Dylan Baldi saw Albini as someone who made bands "sound like they're playing a live show," and that he wanted the album "to sound like us playing." Albini had a hands-off approach to recording the album during the four days Cloud Nothings recorded with him. Dylan Baldi claimed that Albini spent much of the recording time playing Scrabble and blogging, and that Albini never made any suggestions to the band. Albini elaborated on Baldi's claim in an Ask Me Anything, saying that he would read "dry, un-interesting stuff" to prevent him from interfering with the recording process when unnecessary, while at the same time being able to stop what he's doing when he hears something obtrusive.

Musical style
Attack on Memory saw a change in Cloud Nothings' musical style. While previous Cloud Nothings albums were pop albums, the tone of Attack on Memory is more aggressive. Dylan Baldi called the album a bunch of "depressing songs," and cited his boredom with power pop as attributable to the  album's musical style. Additionally, the title was a reflection of Baldi's feelings towards Cloud Nothings' previous sound: "an attack on the memory of what people thought the band was."

For specific influences, Baldi cited Black Sabbath, Nina Hagen, Killdozer, Zounds, Thin Lizzy, The Wipers, Bitch Magnet and Swell Maps.

Release
Attack on Memory was first announced on October 28, 2011. The first single from the album was "No Future/No Past," released on November 7, 2011. "No Future/No Past" received a Best New Track designation from Pitchfork. The second single from the album was "Stay Useless," released December 9, 2011. Like "No Future/No Past," "Stay Useless" received a Best New Track designation from Pitchfork. A third track from Attack on Memory, "No Sentiment," was released on January 13, 2012. On January 17, 2012, the album was streamed in its entirety.

Reception

Attack on Memory has received strong reviews. The album has a score of 83 out of 100 on the review aggregate site Metacritic, based on 33 reviews.

Pitchforks Ian Cohen gave the album a Best New Album designation, writing "But like the best of indie's recent guitar bands that dare to skew retro [...] Attack on Memory is too visceral to feel like escapism, too vital to feel like cheap revival." Steven Hyden of The A.V. Club also praised the album, writing "Baldi used to write like a kid anxiously dodging boredom; on Attack On Memory, he’s moved in the opposite direction, opening up wide spaces in his music and letting the fury beneath breathe and then bellow." Consequence of Sound's Michael Roffman praised the album "[d]espite the vaguely emo lyricism," writing "Baldi hardly comes off as juvenile. He’s far too sincere and angst-driven, only it’s the "from-the-bowels" sort of angst that Hutch Harris trademarked with his Thermals outfit. Zachary Houle of PopMatters called the album "an album that was well worth the wait," writing "Hyper and frenzied, Attack on Memory has every right to be an anticipated early album of 2012. It’s great, catchy as hell, and bristling with retro rage and vitriol."

Tiny Mix Tapes' Conrad Tao, on the other hand, criticized the lyrics, writing "'No Future/No Past' and 'No Sentiment' work as anthems of angst but are lyrically confused, the former’s aggression at odds with its insistence on apathy while the latter has the worst line of the whole album: 'No nostalgia, no sentiment, we’re over it now.'" Adam Downer of Sputnikmusic also had a mixed reaction to the album, writing on the band's new sound: "They might misguidedly masquerade as something more 'authentic' by hiding behind a bunch of muddy bullshit, but the muddy bullshit is conspicuously calculated, which invalidates its purpose. In other words, they try not to be what they were previously by aping a different, heavier sound, and the resulting record's a hodgepodge."

Accolades 
Pitchfork ranked Attack on Memory #19 on its list of the top 50 albums of 2012, writing: "For too long, indie bands didn’t want to get their hands dirty; with Attack on Memory, Cloud Nothings were out for blood."  The album was listed at #21 on Rolling Stones list of the top 50 albums of 2012, saying "Drums pummel, guitars chew scenery, and Baldi's scream makes old-school aggro-depression feel like new-school joy."  The album was listed 6th on Stereogum's list of top 50 albums of 2012.

Acclaimed Music, a site which aggregates hundreds of critics' lists from around the world into an all-time ranking, declares the album as the 1005th most acclaimed of all-time.

Track listing 
All songs by Cloud Nothings.

Charts

References 

2012 albums
Cloud Nothings albums
Carpark Records albums
Albums produced by Steve Albini
Wichita Recordings albums